Monacan High School is a public secondary school in Chesterfield County, Virginia, United States, near the city of Richmond.

The school was founded in 1979, and is a part of Chesterfield County Public Schools. It’s enrollment is roughly 1550 students. The building underwent a major renovation in the summer of 2015 into the fall of 2016. The almost $30 million project brought a brand new fine arts wing, including new band, chorus, orchestra, and black box theater spaces, along with a music production lab. Connected to the new fine arts wing, is a new athletic space including a new three-court gym and premier training facility. Also, a part of the renovation was brand new main and counseling office spaces, along with a brand new library, complete with academic meeting rooms and a multi-media recording studio.

Stan Murmur, of the Stan Murmur controversy, taught at Monacan High School.

Sports
Sports include field hockey, golf, football, volleyball, cheerleading, dance, cross country, indoor track, wrestling, basketball, swimming, soccer, lacrosse, outdoor track, baseball, softball, tennis, forensics and debate. 
The Chiefs Stadium underwent a massive renovation in 2013 when they replaced all the bleachers and installed new sound systems.

Monacan High School is a member of the Dominion District in all sports. Notable moments in Monacan Sports include:
1979 – 1986 Boys Cross Country went undefeated in Dual Meets and won eight straight Dominion District Championships
1980 – Boys Cross Country Team wins Group AAA State Championships
1981 – Girls and Boys Cross Country Teams win Group AAA State Championships
1982 – Boys Tennis Wins Dominion District and Central Regional Championships
1983 – Boys Baseball Team wins the Central District Baseball Championship and Central Region Baseball Championship
1985 – Boys Basketball Team beats Number One Ranked Petersburg Team and goes to State Playoffs
1985 – Boys Baseball Team completes an undefeated regular season; Six members of the Boys Baseball Team help American Legion Post 186 win the World Series
1989 – Boys Baseball Team wins Central Region Baseball Championship and the Football Team wins Central Region Football Semifinals
1992 – Debate Team wins VHSL State Championship
1994 – Girls Basketball Team wins Central Region Girls Basketball Championship (63–62)
1998 – Boys Volleyball Team wins State Group 3A Championship
2000 – Forensics Team wins 3A State Tournament
2002 – Boys Volleyball Team wins State Group 3A Championship
2004 – Boys Tennis Team wins Dominion District Championship (15–0) Central Region Finalists
2006 – Baseball wins State Group 3A Championship
2007 – Dominion District Forensics Sweeps
2007 – Boys Volleyball Dominion District Regular Season and Tournament Champions
2008 – Dominion District Forensics Sweeps
2008 – Central Region Forensics 2nd Place Sweeps
2009 – Dominion District Debate Sweeps
2009 – Golf Team wins Dominion District Regular season and Tournament Champions
2010 – Dominion District Debate second Place Sweeps
2010 – Central Region Debate Sweeps
2010 – Boys Basketball Team wins Dominion District
2012 – Girls Basketball Team wins Dominion District
2014 - Girls Basketball Team splits Conference 20 Championship with Midlothian (game not played due to snow)
2014 – Girls Basketball Team wins 4A States
2015 - Girls Basketball Team wins Conference 20 Championship
2015 - Girls Basketball Team wins 4A East Regional Championship
2015 – Girls Basketball Team wins 4A States
2015 - Boys Basketball Team wins Conference 20 Championship
2015 – Boys Basketball Team wins 4A States as the lowest seeded team, upsetting two number one seeds en route to the championship
2016 - Combined Swim Team wins the Inaugural Chesterfield County Championship
2016 - Girls Soccer Team finishes with an undefeated regular season record, the first girls team in school history
2016 - Girls Soccer Team wins Conference 20 Championship
2016 – Girls Soccer Team wins 4A East Regionals
2016 - Boys Volleyball Team wins Conference 20 Championship
2016 - Boys Volleyball Team wins 4A Western Section Regionals
2016 - Boys Volleyball Team wins 4A States
2016 - Girls Basketball Team wins 4A States
2017 - Combined Swim Team wins the Chesterfield County Championship
2017 - Girls Basketball wins 4A States.
2017 - Girls Basketball finishes the regular season and postseason undefeated, the first complete perfect season in school history
2017 - Girls Basketball climbed as high as the #2 team in the country

Academics
Monacan offers standard core classes along with honors classes, electives, and Advanced Placement Program classes.

Advanced Placement Program classes at Monacan currently include Biology, Calculus AB, Chemistry, Computer Science, English/Literature, Environmental Science, Human Geography, Physics, Psychology, Spanish, Statistics, U.S. History and U.S. Government.

Advanced Placement classes such as Art History, French, German, Latin, Virgil, Music Theory and World History are offered on an enrollment basis, if there are enough interested students to create the class.

Monacan's World Language Department offers Latin, Spanish, and French. In the past, Japanese and Greek have been taught, but in the 2006–2007 school year, these subjects were not offered. German was taken out of the course offerings in the 2009–2010 school year.

In 2008, Monacan's music department earned the Virginia Music Educators Association Blue Ribbon Award.  The Performing Arts at Monacan offer classes in choir, band, orchestra, guitar and theatre. Monacan also, earned the Blue Ribbon Award in 2009, 2010, 2011, 2012, 2013, 2014, 2015, 2016 and 2017.

In 2016, the Academic Team won the Conference 20 Scholastic Bowl Championship.

Center for the Humanities 

The Center for the Humanities is a selective specialty center at Monacan High School.  Eighth-grade students must apply and be reviewed, which includes an interview. Applications from said students have grown to over 100 each year. The Center for the Humanities has a rigorous curriculum that requires all of its students to take certain courses and receive an Advanced Studies Diploma. The program enrolled its first students in the fall of 2000 and the first class graduated in 2004. The goal is an enriched, advanced liberal arts education. Requirements include:
Four years of the course Perspectives on the Human Experience
English 9, 10, 11 and AP English
World History/Geography up to 1500 CE, AP European History, AP United States History and AP Government
At least four years of a foreign language
Four years of science, including Biology and either Chemistry or Physics
Participation in an extended service-learning class

One of the foundations of the Humanities Curriculum is the Perspectives on the Human Experience course. The course is unique to the Center for the Humanities, and integrates art, art history, history and other disciplines.

Another foundation of the Humanities Curriculum is the Socratic Seminar, a student-led group discussion that focuses on one specific topic. Socratic Seminars aim to foster student leadership, communication skills and discussion techniques.
/

Health Professions and Therapies Center
The Health Professions and Therapies Center is a selective specialty center that provides students with academic and practical field experiences in preventative medicine and therapeutic health careers.  Students explore health care careers that focus on therapy and prevention such as: sports medicine; athletic training; physical and occupational therapy; physical education; and exercise science.

Students choosing this center:

Develop a strong foundation of knowledge and skills that would support a health care career in therapeutic or preventive health care, with a focus on sports medicine and/or athletic training, physical therapy, occupational therapy and human performance.
Participate in lab-based practical and clinical applications.
Demonstrate professional behavior and ethical decision-making skills.
Assess problems critically and develop practical solutions.
Communicate clearly and concisely using appropriate terminology.

Monacan High School Marching Chiefs 
The Monacan High School Marching Chiefs are a seven time Virginia Honor Band and a six-time VMEA Blue Ribbon School for Music. The current band director of the Marching Chiefs is Jennifer Ryan. Joining Monacan in the spring of 2000, Ryan has directed over twenty one shows including some of Monacan's most recent shows, "Music From The Lion King" and "The Music of Motown". The Lion King earned them an array of awards during their 2015 competition season including 1st Place Percussion, 2nd Place Overall in Class AA, Best Music, 1st Place Auxiliary and scoring a state rating of Excellent at VBODA 2015. Their 2016 field show entitled "The Music of Motown", consisted of classic songs like "Ain't No Mountain High Enough" and "Get Ready". The Marching Chiefs took "Motown" to several competitions and events throughout Virginia including, "Showcase of Bands", "James Madison University: Parade of Champions", and VBODA 2016. At the Hermitage Classic 2016, the Marching Chiefs took 3rd in class AAA overall, earning a VBODA Competition rating of 79.5/100, "Excellent". On October 29, 2016, the Marching Chiefs earned a final VBODA State Competition Rating of 85.0/100, "Superior". On September 28, 2018, The Marching Chiefs took their 2018 Field Show entitled, "The Music of Santana" to the Hermitage Classic. Earning 1st Place Music and 3rd Place Overall in class 3A, their total score came to 81/100. On October 13, 2018, Monacan took their show to the Midlothian High School Showcase of Bands, receiving an overall score of 89/100 and 2nd Place overall in Class 4A, also taking 1st Place General Effect and 2nd Place in Music, Percussion, Auxiliary, and Marching.

2018 VHSL Ken Tilley Student Leaders Conference at Monacan High School
Monacan High School was selected to be the site host for the 22nd Annual VHSL Ken Tilley Student Leaders Conference. Beating out several other applicants, Monacan made history by being both the smallest and oldest school to ever host the SLC. From the beginning, their conference committee had a dream to impact students and change the way they perceive themselves. It doesn't matter who you are or where you come from, anyone can be a leader. Anyone can change the world.

An experience unlike any other, the conference allows students to unlock their leadership potential and expand that potential into their schools and communities. With thought provoking keynote speakers as well as captivating breakout sessions, it's one of the biggest leaders conferences in Virginia for high school youth. By the end, Monacan's edition of the conference brought over 900 leaders from over 64 different high schools statewide.

Notable alumni
Kate Lindsey – mezzo-soprano opera singer, performed with the Metropolitan Opera, in Carnegie Hall, Washington D.C., Los Angeles, London, Paris, Munich and Vienna.
Corey Reynolds – actor, known for his role as David Gabriel on the TV series The Closer.
Megan Walker – professional basketball player for the Atlanta Dream of the WNBA. 9th overall pick in 2020 by the New York Liberty. Former UCONN Husky. Led Monacan to multiple State Titles.

References

External links
Monacan Website

1979 establishments in Virginia
Educational institutions established in 1979
Public high schools in Virginia
Schools in Chesterfield County, Virginia